The Lebanese film industry produced over twenty feature films and seven short films in 2014. This article fully lists all non-pornographic films, including short films, that had a release date in that year and which were at least partly made by Lebanon. It does not include films first released in previous years that had release dates in 2014.

Major releases

Minor releases

See also

 2014 in film
 2014 in Lebanon
 Cinema of Lebanon
 List of Lebanese submissions for the Academy Award for Best Foreign Language Film

References

External links

Lebanese
Films

Lebanon